Prionosciadium is a genus in the carrot family, Apiaceae. It is endemic to Mexico. The plants are biennial herbs with large taproots.

Species 
There are currently 14 described species in Prionosciadium:

 Prionosciadium bellii Mathias & Constance - Michoacán
 Prionosciadium cuneatum J.M.Coult. & Rose - Jalisco
 Prionosciadium diversifolium Rose - Guerrero
 Prionosciadium humile Rose - Nuevo León
 Prionosciadium lilacinum Mathias & Constance - Jalisco, Nayarit
 Prionosciadium linearifolium (S. Watson) J.M.Coult. & Rose -  Puebla, Zacatecas
 Prionosciadium madrense  S. Wats. - Chihuahua
 Prionosciadium megacarpum  J.M.Coult. & Rose - Oaxaca
 Prionosciadium nelsonii J.M.Coult. & Rose - Morelos, Chiapas
 Prionosciadium saraviki Laferr. - Chihuahua
 Prionosciadium tamayoi  - Jalisco
 Prionosciadium thapsoides (DC.) Mathias - Veracruz, Mexico State
 Prionosciadium townsendii Rose - Chihuahua
 Prionosciadium watsonii J.M.Coult. & Rose - Durango, Sinaloa, Oaxaca

References

Endemic flora of Mexico
Taxa named by Sereno Watson
Apioideae
Apioideae genera